Wakkerstroom, (Awake Stream), is the second oldest town in Mpumalanga province, South Africa. The town is on the KwaZulu-Natal border, 27 km east of Volksrust and 56 km south-east of Amersfoort.

History
The settlement was laid out on the farm Gryshoek by Dirk Cornelis (Swart Dirk) Uys (1814–1910), proclaimed in 1859 by President Pretorius, and administered by a village council from 1910. Swart Dirk Uys, who surveyed the property using a 50-yard thong made from an eland he shot on arrival, originally named the town Uysenburg, but the name was changed by the Executive Council of the South African Republic to Marthinus-Wesselstroom, after the president's first names, and also known as Wesselstroom. In 1904 the name of the town was changed again to Wakkerstroom, meaning "awake stream" or "lively stream", which is an Afrikaans translation of the Zulu name for the river  (English: awake) that flows near the town.

The courthouse, St. Mark's Church, and the old bridge over the river have been declared national monuments.  H. Rider Haggard's novel She: A History of Adventure was written while he lived on Hoog Street. The bridge dates to 1893, when it was built under the South African Republic from German steel. South Africa's first black member of the Christ Community Church was baptized by D. Bryant in 1904.

First Boer War
Wakkerstroom was occupied by the 58th (Rutlandshire) Regiment of Foot, the 80th Regiment of Foot (Staffordshire Volunteers), and 1st King's Dragoon Guards in 1880–1881 during the First Boer War. Remains of the Staffordshire and Dragoon encampments can be found on the slopes of the Ossewakop and Voortrekkerkop passes south of town.

Second Boer War
During the Second Boer War, the British built twenty-one blockhouses between Volksrust and Wakkerstroom and a hundred between Wakkerstroom and Piet Retief, Mpumalanga. The blockhouses were built to guard the British supply lines from Durban.

The Real History of Mhlongamvula
 
The earliest known people that lived in Mhlongamvula, in the Wakkerstroom area were the Khoisan. Many examples of rock art usually attributed to them can be found in the area. These people were undoubtedly attracted to the vast herds of game that were found on the grassland plains of the area. The herds were mainly migratory and were attracted to the rich bounty offered by the regenerating grasslands after the first spring rains As the summer progressed these grasses would become less and less palatable until, by the time the first frosts of autumn arrived they would have withdrawn most, if not all, of their nutrients into their root systems. The herds would move on to other pastures and the Khoisan would probably follow them and not remain in the Wakkerstroom area during the winter months.
 
Settlement by Nguni and Sotho peoples
It seems likely that the first Nguni or Sotho people may have arrived in the Wakkerstroom area in the 15th Century or earlier. Whether they settled in the area, visited it occasionally or merely passed through it on their way to somewhere else is not clear.
Gradually the area was settled by Nguni and Sotho people. In the mid 18th Century the death of Ngwane, the chief of a small group of Nguni people of the same name, resulted in a struggle for succession between two of his sons, Ludonga and Dlamini. The Ngwane were the nucleus of the people later to be known as the Swazi nation. Ludonga and a band of his supporters eventually fled and hid in a cave on Mhlongamvula, part of the KwaMandlangampisi mountain complex overlooking the present day hamlets of Dirkiesdorp to the north and Lüneburg to the south. The Khoisan people who occupied the cave at the time were evicted and the Swazi occupation of the area to the east of Wakkerstroom began. Around the same time the Hlubi, a Sotho tribe, were ensconced in the catchment of the upper umZinyathi (Buffalo) River in the area of the present-day towns of Wakkerstroom, Volksrust, Utrecht and Vryheid.
Further to the south-east Dingiswayo, after unsuccessfully trying to oust his father, Jobe, as ruler of the Mthethwa fled into exile. For at least part of his time in exile he gained refuge among the Hlubi. After Jobe’s death, Dingiswayo returned to Mthethwa territory and ousted his brother who had succeeded Jobe. Dingiswayo is credited with developing and implementing the age-regiment system among the Mthethwa – a system that was soon used to great effect by his General and protégé – Shaka.
 
Dingiswayo and Zwide welded together a number of smaller tribes into two major opposing tribal confederations in eastern South Africa – the Mthethwa and the Ndwandwe. Their bitter enmity resulted in Dingiswayo being killed by Zwide in 1818. To honour his name Dingiswayo’s name Langalibalele, the Hlubi chief born in this year, was given the second name of Mthethwa. The Balelesberge south of Wakkerstroom were named after the Hlubi chief.
Zwide and the Ndwandwe was defeated by Shaka near Ulundi and the tribe scattered. Although Zwide died elsewhere in 1825 it is rumoured that he was buried on a farm between Wakkerstroom and Volksrust.
 
The Mfecane and its effects on the Wakkerstroom area
These events sparked of the Mfecane – a period of terrible wars which affected developments throughout southern Africa as far north as southern Tanzania for almost the entire 19th century. They also had a profound effect on the Wakkerstroom area.
A group of Ngwane, living under their chief Matiwane in the area east of the present Vryheid were attacked, first by Dingiswayo and then by Zwide. They fled westwards and fell upon the Hlubi in the upper umZinyathi in the Wakkerstroom area. The Hlubi were defeated and their people either fled, survived in scattered remnants (e.g. a group of Sotho speaking Hlubi still survive in the Vryheid district and still cling to traditions long since abandoned in Lesotho). The Ngwane were in turn dislodged from the old Hlubi lands when they were attacked by Shaka.
At least in part the Mfecane can be said to have been one of the stimulants of the Great Trek. Populations of large parts of the southern Highveld, the present-day KwaZulu-Natal had been devastated and dislocated. While these areas had never been cleared of people the tendency of their inhabitants to hide in sheltered places gave the impression of empty lands to the Boer reconnaissance expeditions in 1834 and 1835.
After the Battle of Blood River in 1838 and the subsequent death of Dingane in 1840, Mpande became ruler of Zululand with the help of the Boer settlers.
In acknowledgement for this help he granted them the right to settle, among other places, along the umZinyati (Buffalo River) in the area of the presentday town of Utrecht – part of the former territory of the Hlubi and the Ngwane and a seemingly empty landscape in the wake of the Mfecane.
The Boers, under Andries Pretorius formed the short-lived republic of Natalia.
After four years of independence the British defeated Boer forces at Congella near Durban and annexed the republic as the district of Natal under the jurisdiction of the Cape Colony. This annexation led to the large scale exodus of Boers from the area. Among them was “Swart Dirk” (named after his black beard and hair) Uys. He initially settled in the area between the present-day towns of Wakkerstroom and Utrecht.
 
Source: Historian, Richard Mdvumowencwala Patricks, Senior Research Officer: Swaziland National Museum, Lobamba.

Economy
Sheep and cattle farming are the primary industries. Proposed coal mining in the area has raised concerns due to the environmental sensitivity of the region.

Environment
With the Balele Mountains to the south, the area surrounding the town is mountainous with kloofs, mountain springs, vlei areas, dams, conservation and heritage sites. It is internationally renowned as a "birder's paradise". Due to the high occurrence of high priority wetlands and the proximity to the sources of three rivers, the Vaal, Tugela (via Buffalo tributary) and Pongola, it was declared a National Freshwater Ecosystem Priority Area. It is also a protected area under the Protected Areas Act, which means that mining is generally not allowed.

The Yzermyn project of Uthaka Energy (Pty) Ltd, a coal-mining company, was put on hold in 2021, after a coalition of civil society organisations objected to mining in one of South Africa's critical water source areas.

Sources
 Erasmus, B.P.J. (1995). Op Pad in Suid-Afrika. New York: Jonathan Ball. 
 Rosenthal, Eric (1967). Ensiklopedie van Suidelike Afrika. London: Frederick Warne.

References

External links
 Wakkerstroom Home Page

Populated places in the Pixley ka Seme Local Municipality
Populated places established in 1859
1859 establishments in South Africa